Springville Historic District may refer to:

Springville Historic District (Springville, Alabama), listed on the National Register of Historic Places in St. Clair County, Alabama
Springville Historic District (Springville, Utah), listed on the National Register of Historic Places in Utah County, Utah